Max Weiss is an American scholar and translator, specialising in the culture and history of the Middle East. He studied biology and history at University of California, Berkeley before moving on to Stanford University, where he completed his PhD in modern Middle Eastern history in 2007. He joined the faculty of Princeton University in 2010.

Weiss is the author of In the Shadow of Sectarianism: Law, Shi'ism and the Making of Modern Lebanon (2010). He is also a noted translator of contemporary Arabic literature into English. His translation of Abbas Beydoun's novel Blood Test won the Arkansas Arabic Translation Award.

Weiss is also a two-time fellow of the Harvard Society of Fellows.

Books

As author

 In the Shadow of Sectarianism: Law, Shi'ism and the Making of Modern Lebanon (2010)

As translator

 B as in Beirut by Iman Humaydan Younes
 Blood Test by Abbas Beydoun
 A Tunisian Tale by Hassouna Mosbahi
 The Silence and the Roar by Nihad Sirees
 States of Passion by Nihad Sirees
 The Beekeeper: Rescuing the Stolen Women of Iraq by Dunya Mikhail
 work by Fawwaz Haddad (forthcoming)

See also
 List of Arabic-English translators

References

Princeton University faculty
American translators
Arabic–English translators
Living people
Year of birth missing (living people)